SGS may refer to:

Acronym usage
 ISO 639-3 code for the Samogitian dialect
 ISO 3166 trigram for South Georgia and the South Sandwich Islands
 FAA location identifier for South St. Paul Municipal Airport

Companies and organizations
 SGS Essen, a German multi-sports club
 SGS S.A. (formerly Société Générale de Surveillance), a Swiss company providing inspection, verification, testing and certification services
 SGS-ATES (Società Generale Semiconduttori – Aquila Tubi E Semiconduttori), a former Italian company now merged into STMicroelectronics
 SGS/SCN, regional television stations in Australia
 Saudi Geological Survey, the national geological survey of the Kingdom of Saudi Arabia
 Serbian Genealogical Society, a learned society that is engaged in genealogical research
 Sisters of the Good Samaritan, a Roman Catholic congregation of religious women
 Styling Garage, a German automobile tuner and coachbuilder active in the 1980s

Entertainment
 Sahaba of Greater Sahel, a fictional African Islamist terrorist group in season 5 of SEAL Team (TV series)
 Search Guard Successor Foundation, a fictional organization in the Japanese Super Sentai show GoGo Sentai Boukenger
 Super Girl Seven, the protagonists of Supergirl (Japanese TV series)

Schools
 St. George's School (disambiguation), various locations

England
 Slough Grammar School, in Berkshire
 South Gloucestershire and Stroud College, in Gloucestershire
 Spalding Grammar School, in Lincolnshire
 Stafford Grammar School, in Staffordshire
 Steyning Grammar School, in West Sussex
 Stockport Grammar School, in Stockport
 Stretford Grammar School, in Greater Manchester
 Sutton Grammar School, in South London

Elsewhere
 Seattle Girls' School, in the U.S. state of Washington
 Sligo Grammar School, in County Sligo, Ireland
 Sydney Grammar School, in Sydney, Australia

Science and technology
 Samsung Galaxy S, a series of Android smartphones
 Satellite ground station, a terrestrial radio station designed for extraplanetary telecommunication with spacecraft
 Schweizer SGS, a series of gliders manufactured by Schweizer Aircraft
 Strong generating set, a concept in the group theory of mathematics
 Sulforaphane glucosinolate, a chemical compound

Other
 Shadow Government Statistics, former name of the Shadowstats.com website
 South Georgia Survey, four expeditions (1951–1957) led by V. Duncan Carse which mapped the South Georgia Antarctic archipelago
 Śūraṅgama Samādhi Sūtra, an early Mahayana sutra of Indian origin

See also